Winkworth may refer to:

Places 
 Boxhill (Louisville), also known as "Winkworth", a Georgian Revival house in Glenview, Kentucky
 Winkworth Arboretum, a National Trust-owned arboretum in Surrey, England

People 
 Catherine Winkworth (1827–1878), an English translator
 Ronald Winkworth (1884–1950), a British natural historian
 Susanna Winkworth (1820–1884), an English translator and philanthropist

Fictional characters 
 Dame Daphne Winkworth, a recurring character in the stories of English comic writer P. G. Wodehouse

Organizations 
 Winkworth plc, an estate agents in London, England